Kentucky Route 242 (KY 242) is a  long east–west state highway located south of the city limits of Bowling Green in rural Warren County, Kentucky. The western terminus of the route is at US 68 and KY 80 northwest of Rockfield. The eastern terminus is at KY 622 south of Plano.

Route description

The route begins at an intersection with the cojoined US 68/KY 80, known locally as Russellville Road. After crossing US 31W, the route continues another  through the Richpond community before intersecting with Kentucky Route 884, named Three Springs Road.

Past KY 884, the route narrows considerably for the remainder of its length. Three miles after the junction with KY 884, the route traverses Interstate 65 by way of an overpass. KY 242 then continues for another  before ending at its eastern terminus at KY 622 just south of the Plano community.

Major junctions

References

0242
Transportation in Warren County, Kentucky